The New England water resource region is one of 21 major geographic areas, or regions, in the first level of classification used by the United States Geological Survey to divide and sub-divide the United States into successively smaller hydrologic units. These geographic areas contain either the drainage area of a major river, or the combined drainage areas of a series of rivers.

This region includes the drainage within the United States that ultimately discharges into: (a) the Bay of Fundy; (b) the Atlantic Ocean within and between the states of Maine and Connecticut; (c) Long Island Sound north of the New York-Connecticut state line; and (d) the Riviere St. Francois, a tributary of the Saint Lawrence River. The region includes all of Maine, New Hampshire and Rhode Island, and parts of Connecticut, Massachusetts, New York, and Vermont.

List of water resource subregions

See also
List of rivers of the United States
Water resource region

References

Lists of drainage basins
Drainage basins
Watersheds of the United States
Regions of the United States
 Resource
Water resource regions